WEC Bonus Awards are three separate cash bonuses usually awarded to four fighters after each WEC event, based on internal decision by WEC management.  More/fewer bonuses have been awarded at some events, especially when no knockouts or submissions occurred.

 Fight of the Night is awarded to the two fighters who delivered the most impressive fight on the card.
 Knockout of the Night is awarded to the fighter with the most impressive knockout/technical knockout.
 Submission of the Night is awarded to the fighter with the most impressive submission.

Fighters With the Most Awards

Award Recipients
This list is based on the information available at fightmetric.com, the official Zuffa/WEC statistics provider.

See also
List of UFC bonus award recipients

References

World Extreme Cagefighting